Warawtampu (Quechua waraw high and deep, tampu inn, Hispanicized spelling Huarautambo) is an archaeological site in the Pasco Region in Peru. It is located in the Daniel Alcides Carrión Province, Yanahuanca District, in the community of that name. The archaeological site of Astupampa is close to it.

The complex was built during the government of Pachakutiq Inka Yupanki. Some of the most interesting buildings at Warawtampu are Inkawasi ("Inca house"), Warmiwasi ("woman house") and Phaqcha ("waterfall"), an altar for water ceremonies.

Gallery

References 

Archaeological sites in Peru
Archaeological sites in Pasco Region
Populated places in the Pasco Region